Marjorie Boulton (7 May 1924 – 30 August 2017) was a British author and poet writing in both English and Esperanto.

Biography 
Marjorie Boulton studied English at Somerville College, Oxford where she was taught by C.S. Lewis and J.R.R. Tolkien. She was a candidate for the Nobel Prize in Literature in 2008.

She taught English literature in teacher training and (from 1962 to 1970) as a college principal for 24 years before turning to full-time research and writing. She is a well-known writer in Esperanto. Boulton in her later years was president of two Esperanto organisations, Kat-amikaro and ODES.

She was the author of Zamenhof: Creator of Esperanto — a biography of L. L. Zamenhof published in 1960 by Routledge & Kegan Paul of London. She also wrote a widely-used series of introductory texts on literary studies: The Anatomy of Poetry (1953), The Anatomy of Prose (1954), The Anatomy of Drama (1960), The Anatomy  of Language (1968), The Anatomy of the Novel (1975) and The Anatomy of Literary Studies (1980). Her first book was Preliminaries: Poems (1949). Later books of poetry, as well as short story collections, were in Esperanto, which she learnt in 1949. She wrote as well Saying What We Mean (1959), Words in Real Life (1965) and Reading in Real Life (1971).
She had also translated Harivansh Rai Bachchan's MADHUSALA (1935) to English.

References

External links 

1924 births
2017 deaths
British women poets
Alumni of Somerville College, Oxford
Akademio de Esperanto members
Writers of Esperanto literature
English Esperantists
Women biographers
British textbook writers
Women textbook writers
British biographers
20th-century British poets
20th-century biographers
20th-century British women writers